Young Bosnia was a separatist and revolutionary movement active in the Condominium of Bosnia and Herzegovina, Austria-Hungary before World War I. Its members were predominantly young male students, primarily Bosnian Serbs, but it also included Bosnian Muslims and Croats. There were two key ideologies promoted amongst the members of the group—the Yugoslavist (unification into a Yugoslavia) and the Pan-Serb (unification into Serbia). Philosophically, Young Bosnia was inspired by a variety of ideas, movements, and events, such as German romanticism, anarchism, Russian revolutionary socialism, Fyodor Dostoevsky, Friedrich Nietzsche, and the Battle of Kosovo.

Background
The rise to power of the popular Karađorđević dynasty in Serbia in the 1900s after the May Overthrow of the Obrenović dynasty by the Serbian Army in 1903, stimulated support by both Serbs and South Slavs for their unification into a state led by Belgrade. Support for revolutionary Yugoslavism in Bosnia grew with the rise of the Serbo-Croatian Progressive Organization in 1911, and drew in support for the cause from Serbs as well as Croats and some Bosniaks. Bosniak members of the movement included Avdo Sumbul and Behdžet Mutevelić.

Formation, membership and ideology
There were a number of youth-oriented organizations before the rise of Young Bosnia, such as United Serb Youth in the 1860s and 1870s. Defining membership and the vague idea of "youth" (omladina) was debated at length among South Slavic intellectuals. One major obstacle to defining and organizing the youth in Bosnia-Herzegovina was the educational system, which underwent major changes in the Habsburg period. By 1900, a small but growing number of young men from Bosnia were studying in Prague, Zagreb, Vienna, Graz, Istanbul, and Belgrade. This put them in touch with Serbian and Croatian nationalist circles.

The Young Bosnia circle was formed after the Austro-Hungarian annexation of Bosnia in 1908, with significant influence from neighbouring Serbia. The ideologue of Young Bosnia and tyrannicide as its method of the political struggle, was Vladimir Gaćinović. In one letter to Dedijer, one of revolutionaries from Herzegovina (Božidar Zečević) stated that the name of Young Bosnia was first mentioned by Petar Kočić in journal "Homeland" in 1907; according to some sources Zečević was mistaken about the year of publication. In 1911 Gaćinović published an article titled "Young Bosnia" in Almanac published by Prosvjeta. The Serbian National Organization of Petar Kočić had ties with the Young Bosnia.

The members were predominantly school students, primarily Serbs but also Bosniaks and Croats. There were several motivations promoted amongst different members of the group. There were members who promoted Yugoslavist aims of pan-South Slav unification of territories including Bosnia into a Yugoslavia. There were members who promoted Serbian nationalist aims of pan-Serb unification into Serbia. Young Bosnia was inspired from a variety of ideas, movements, and events; such as German romanticism, anarchism, Russian revolutionary socialism, Fyodor Dostoyevsky, Friedrich Nietzsche, and the Battle of Kosovo.

Young Bosnia received some assistance from the Black Hand – a secret organization founded by members of the Serbian Army. On the other hand, Vladimir Gaćinović was the only Young Bosnia leader to join Black Hand, although after the First World War broke out he condemned the assassination in a letter (presumably as a way to evade responsibility).

Assassination of Archduke Franz Ferdinand of Austria 

Two notable organizations are referred to in connection with Young Bosnia: Narodna Odbrana and Black Hand.
During a Serbian Court Martial in French-occupied Salonika in 1916–17, Chief of Serbian Military Intelligence Dragutin Dimitrijević Apis testified that he had organized the assassination of Archduke Franz Ferdinand of Austria, in Sarajevo on 28 June 1914, (the assassin was Gavrilo Princip). In the process, he used not only his power over elements of the Serbian military, but also the Black Hand. Leaders of the Black Hand in turn had penetrated Narodna Odbrana and used that organization to infiltrate the arms and assassins into Sarajevo.

"The political union of the Yugoslavs [..] was my basic idea [..] I am a Yugoslav nationalist, aiming for the unification of all Yugoslavs, and I do not care what form of state, but it must be free from Austria"-Gavrilo Princip during his trial

Claimed members of Young Bosnia who participated in the assassination were:

Danilo Ilić (27 July 1890 – 3 February 1915)
Veljko Čubrilović (1 July 1886 – 3 February 1915)
Miško Jovanović (15 June 1878 - 3 February 1915)
Nedeljko Čabrinović (2 February 1895 – 20 January 1916)
Vladimir Gaćinović (25 May 1890 – 11 August 1917)
Trifko Grabež (28 June 1895 – February 1916)
Gavrilo Princip (25 July 1894 – 28 April 1918)
Muhamed Mehmedbašić (1886 – 29 May 1943)
Cvjetko Popović (1896 – 9 June 1980)
Vaso Čubrilović (14 January 1897 – 11 June 1990)

An evening before the assassination of Archduke Franz Ferdinand, Princip, Čabrinović and Ilić visited the grave of Bogdan Žerajić for the last time. Žerajić's proclamation "He who wants to live, let him die. He who wants to die, let him live", was quoted by Gavrilo Princip in one of the songs he wrote.

Legacy

Museum of Young Bosnia
The Museum of Young Bosnia was built in the period of SFR Yugoslavia in 1953, at the place where the assassination took place.  It commemorates the assassins, popularly known in the Kingdom of Yugoslavia as the "Vidovdan heroes". At the front of the museum was a plaque, inscribed: "From this place, on 28 June 1914, Gavrilo Princip, expressed with his shot the people's revolt against tyranny and their centuries-old struggle for freedom. (Са овога мјеста 28. јуна 1914. године Гаврило Принцип својим пуцњем изрази народни протест против тираније и вјековну тежњу наших народа за слободом.)"  In 1992, soldiers of the Army of the Republic of Bosnia and Herzegovina destroyed both the plaque and Princip's footprints.  German forces had removed the 1930 plaque in 1941. The museum still exists today, but nowadays documents aspects of life in Bosnia & Herzegovina during Austro-Hungarian rule.

See also
 Višnja Mosić

References

Sources

Further reading

External links

 
National liberation movements
World War I
Pan-Slavism
Serbian irredentism
Austro-Hungarian rule in Bosnia and Herzegovina
Austria-Hungary–Serbia relations
Revolutionary organizations against Austria-Hungary
Yugoslavism